The Ologies are a series of illustrated fantasy books presented in a fictional encyclopedic format. The series is primarily edited and authored by Dugald Steer.  The books, which are intended for young readers, are published by Templar Publishing in the United Kingdom, Five Mile Press in Australia and Candlewick Press in the United States. They have been very popular in sales; the first book, Dragonology, remained on the New York Times children's bestsellers list for 76 weeks.

Format
Each of the books is given a fictional "author", and purport to be "lost" journals of fictional investigators. Since the books follow an encyclopedia format rather than a narrative, Steer has said that, "It's slightly different from traditional reading. Readers can dip in and out, but the essential story is told in a linear way."

The books are illustrated by a variety of artists, including Helen Ward, Wayne Anderson, Nghiem Ta, Chris Forsey, A. J. Wood, Douglas Carrel, J.P. Lambert, Ian P. Andrew, Nick Harris, Anne Yvonne Gilbert, John Howe, Tomislav Tomic, G. Hunt, R. Sella, and Carole Thomann.

Works

Books
Dragonology: The Complete Book of Dragons (2003)
Working with Dragons: A Course in Dragonology (2004)
The Dragonology Handbook: A Practical Course in Dragons (2005)
Drake's Comprehensive Compendium of Dragonology (2009)
Egyptology: Search for the Tomb of Osiris (2004)
 The Egyptology Handbook: A Course in the Wonders of Egypt
An Egyptologist's Code-Writing Kit
Wizardology: The Book of the Secrets of Merlin (2005)
 The Wizardology Handbook: A Course for Apprentices
A Guide to Wizards of the World
A Wizard's Code Writing Kit
Pirateology: A Pirate Hunter's Companion (2006)
Captain William Lubber's Pirateology Handbook
A Pirate's Guide and Model Ship
The Pirateology Handbook: A Course in Pirate Hunting (2007)
Mythology: Greek Gods, Heroes, & Monsters (2007)
The Mythology Handbook
Monsterology: The Complete Book of Fabulous Beasts (2008)
Dr. Ernest Drake's Collector's Library
Working with Monsters
The Monsterology Handbook: A Practical Course in Monsters (2008)
Spyology: The Complete Book of Spycraft (2008)
Oceanology: The True Account of the Voyage of the Nautilus (2009)
The Oceanology Handbook: A Course for Underwater Explorers (2010)
Vampireology: The True History of the Fallen Ones (2010)
Alienology: The Complete Book of Extraterrestrials (2010)
Illusionology: The Secret Science of Magic (2012)
Dinosaurology: The Search for a Lost World (2013)
Dungeonology - made in collaboration with Dungeons & Dragons (2016)
Knightology: A True Account of the Most Valiant Knights (2017)
Ghostology: A True Revelation of Spirits, Ghouls, and Hauntings (2020)

Video games
In October 2007, Codemasters announced a licensing agreement to create video games for the Wii and Nintendo DS based on Dragonology, Wizardology and Pirateology. Nik Nak was to develop the Wii titles.

Film adaptations
In 2008, Universal Studios acquired the film rights to the Dragonology series, with  Leonard Hartman set to write and executive produce the adaptation. In August 2012, it was reported that Alex Kurtzman and Roberto Orci would produce the film for Universal.

In October 2012, it was reported that Carlos Saldanha, the director of the Ice Age and Rio films, was developing for 20th Century Fox and Blue Sky Studios an animated feature film based on Alienology: The Complete Book of Extraterrestrials.

On January 31, 2018, Paramount Pictures announced they were in the process of developing a film franchise centered around all 13 Ology books, by setting up a writers room currently consisting of Jeff Pinkner, Michael Chabon, Lindsey Beer, Joe Robert Cole, Nicole Perlman and Christina Hodson. The vision for the franchise is the hope that each of the writers will embrace the books by working with visual artists to create treatments that will eventually evolve into seven movie scripts with interconnected stories. Paramount also announced that Akiva Goldsman will act as overseer and producer of the franchise.

References

External links
Ology World official website
Templar Ologies
Candlewick Press - Catalog - Ologies
Anne Yvonne Gilbert, Ology Illustrator

Book series introduced in 2003
Fantasy books by series
Series of children's books
Encyclopedias of fictional worlds